Gwydir Highway is a  state highway in northern New South Wales, Australia. The highway was named after the Gwydir River, which in turn was named after a locale in Wales.

Route

Gwydir Highway traverses the New England region from the inland plains to the coastal region, linking Walgett, Collarenebri, Moree, Warialda, Inverell, Glen Innes and Grafton.

At Moree it intersects the Newell Highway. At Inverell, it has an intersection with Thunderbolts Way. At Glen Innes it intersects New England Highway. At South Grafton on the Clarence River, it joins Big River Way and Summerland Way. Between Glen Innes and South Grafton, Gwydir Highway runs between the Gibraltar Range and Washpool National Parks.

History
The passing of the Main Roads Act of 1924 through the Parliament of New South Wales provided for the declaration of Main Roads, roads partially funded by the State government through the Main Roads Board (later the Department of Main Roads, and eventually Transport for NSW). Gwydir Highway was declared (as Main Road No. 12) from the intersection with North Coast Highway (today Pacific Highway) in South Grafton, via Buccarumbi, Glen Innes, Inverell, Moree to the crossing of the Barwon River at Mogil Mogil, and Main Road No. 68 was declared along its future alignment from Walgett via Collarenabri to Mogil Mogil (and continuing northwards to the state border with Queensland, and westwards via Brewarrina, Bourke, Louth, Wilcannia, Menindee, Pooncarrie and Wentworth to the state border with South Australia) on the same day, 8 August 1928. With the passing of the Main Roads (Amendment) Act of 1929 to provide for additional declarations of State Highways and Trunk Roads, these were amended to State Highway 12 and Trunk Road 68 on 8 April 1929. In late 1929, the western end was amended to terminate via Grawan Bridge at Collarenebri instead.

In December 1960, a 160-kilometre deviation between Glen Innes and Grafton via Jackadgery opened, with the old road via Buccarumbi renamed Old Glen Innes Road.

The passing of the Roads Act of 1993 updated road classifications and the way they could be declared within New South Wales. Under this act, the western end of Gwydir Highway (as State Highway 12) was extended from Collarenabri to the intersection with Castlereagh Highway north of Walgett, subsuming the former alignment of Main Road 68 (formerly Trunk Road 68, officially splitting it into a western section terminating at Walgett, and an eastern section terminating in Collarenabri), on 17 December 1993. When Pacific Highway's Grafton bypass opened in May 2020, Gwydir Highway (as Highway 12) was officially extended east along the old alignment of Pacific Highway to Tyndale, on 5 July 2022, although the road is known locally and sign-posted as Big River Way. Gwydir Highway today, as part of Highway 12, still retains this declaration.

The highway was allocated National Route 38 in 1962, from Grafton to Collarenebri, later extended with the highway to north of Walgett in 1993. With New South Wales' conversion to the newer alphanumeric system in 2013, this was replaced with route B76 across the whole highway.

Major junctions

See also

 Highways in Australia
 List of highways in New South Wales

References

Highways in New South Wales
New England (New South Wales)
Moree Plains Shire